Election stock markets (also referred to as election prediction markets) are financial markets in which the ultimate values of the contracts being traded are based on the outcome of elections. Participants invest their own funds, buy and sell listed contracts, earn profits and bear the risk of losing money. Election stock markets function like other futures exchanges, such as commodity exchanges for the future delivery of grain, livestock, or precious metals.

The main purpose of an election stock market is to predict the election outcome, such as the share of the popular vote or share of seats each political party receives in a legislature or parliament. Efficient markets are very good at reflecting all available information, often reflecting information faster than opinion polls, which take several days to complete and process. Traders also have a strong financial incentive to reflect their true opinion about the election outcome regardless of their political preferences.

Election stock markets are also used for research and teaching purposes. Researchers can study trader behavior and market operations. Election stock markets also teach participants the fundamentals of trading, such as how to take a long or a short position. A list of related academic research papers appears below.

Examples of election stock markets
In North America, two universities have been operating election stock markets for over a decade. The University of Iowa's Tippie College of Business has been operating the Iowa Electronic Markets . The Iowa markets primarily track presidential and congressional elections. In Canada, the University of British Columbia's Sauder School of Business has been operating the UBC Election Stock Market. The UBC markets track federal and provincial elections in Canada. The Iowa and UBC markets are non-profit operations for research purposes. These markets do not charge commissions or transaction fees. Investments are typically limited to US$500 or CAD 1,000.

Privately run prediction markets have also emerged in recent years. Unlike their university counterparts, commercial prediction markets charge fees or commissions to cover their operating costs. Commercial markets may charge fees per transaction or commissions on net profits, and fees per transaction may be differentiated for price takers (those placing a market order) and price makers (those placing a limit order). Early examples of commercial prediction markets include the now defunct Intrade Prediction Markets and The Washington Stock Exchange; both tracked predictions for a broad set of political events. Commercial prediction markets claim that they attract more investment and generate more trading volume than their academic counterparts as they don't limit a trader's capital investment. The prediction accuracy of commercial and academic election stock markets is an area of active research (see below).

How do election stock markets work?

Types of markets

There are two basic types of election stock markets. The first type is a winner-takes-all market in which only one contract pays a fixed sum, typically $1, and all other contracts pay $0. Examples of this type of winner-takes-all market include a referendum outcome (yes or no), one of several parties winning an absolute majority, or one of several parties winning a plurality.

The other type of election stock market is a proportional share market where the payout of several contracts is determined by percentage proportions of a particular outcome, multiplied by a fixed sum that is typically $1. Two examples of such a market include a seats share market, where payouts are determined by the percentage share of seats that a particular party gains in a parliament, or a popular vote share market, where payouts are determined by the percentage share of a party's popular vote.

The common principle across different types of election stock markets is that the payouts for a "unit portfolio" of contracts must add up to a fixed amount, typically $1.

Creating contracts

Contracts are put into circulation through the purchase of a unit portfolio. A trader purchases a set of all contracts in a particular market worth $1. Consider an election in which three parties compete, a Red Party, a Blue Party, and a Green Party. The share of popular votes for each party must sum to 100% by definition, so holding on to one contract for each of the three parties will always be worth $1 no matter what the election outcome. Buying unit portfolios allows trader to take a short position by selling contracts that they think are overvalued.

Trading contracts

Traders buy and sell contracts, which are typically quoted in 1/10 of a cent corresponding to 1/10 of a percentage point for the votes share or seats share of a political party. Traders make profits by buying undervalued contracts and selling overvalued contracts. If a trader expects the Blue Party to win 42.3% of the popular vote, the trader will find it profitable to buy a contract of the Blue Party if a seller offers it for less than 42.3 cents. The same trader will find it profitable to sell the same contract if another trader is willing to buy it for more than 42.3 cents.

Taking a long position

A trader takes a long position by buying low and selling high. Consider an investor who considers the purchase of a contract in the Blue Party, which is currently offered for 39.3 cents in the market. The investor predicts that the Blue Party will win more than 41%, and buys a contract of the Blue Party for 39.3 cents. On election day the Blue Party wins 42.5% of the popular vote, and the trader realizes a profit of 3.2 cents, an 8.1% return on investment.

Taking a short position

Consider a trader who has bought a unit portfolio consisting of one contract each for the Red Party, the Blue Party, and the Green Party, at a cost of $1. Believing that the contract for the Blue Party is overvalued at its current price, the trader sells one contract of the Blue Party for 30 cents. On election day the Red Party wins 55% of the vote, the Blue Party wins 25% of the vote, and the Green Party wins 20%. The trader now receives 75 cents in total for the Red Party and Green Party contracts, and has an additional 30 cents from the sale of the Blue Party contract. The trader has now $1.05 and has made a profit of 5 cents on an investment of $1.

Market liquidation

Election stock markets typically cease trading the day before the election is held. The markets are liquidated after the election based on the election outcome. In markets for the popular vote share and the parliamentary seats share, each contract is valued precisely equal to the corresponding percentage share. In winner-takes-all markets, the winning contract pays $1, while the losing contracts pay $0.

Reliability of election stock markets 

Election stock markets are prediction markets for a particular purpose: elections. Even though election stock markets have been conducted for almost twenty years, the accuracy of these markets is nearly always judged by comparing the election stock market prediction (closing prices) on election eve with final pre-election polls and actual outcomes. Evidence that election stock markets perform remarkably well predicting election outcomes is found in a string of academic papers, mostly based on data from the Iowa Electronic Markets and the UBC Election Stock Market. Accuracy is typically measured as the average absolute forecast error for vote shares and seat shares. A more rigorous attempt to assess the performance of election stock markets is found in Berg et al. (2008); they report that for five recent elections covered by the Iowa Electronic Markets, the average absolute error in the market's prediction of the major-party presidential vote share across the 5 days prior to the election was 1.20 percentage points, while opinion polls conducted during that same time had an average error of 1.62 percentage points. Berg et al. (2008) also report evidence that election stock markets outperform polls for longer time periods before the election date.

Erikson and Wlezien (2008) challenge the view that election stock markets outperform polls. They argue that polls only measure preferences on the polling day, whereas election stock markets forecast the outcome on election day. When poll leads are discounted using statistical techniques, they find that poll-based forecasts outperform vote-share market prices.

A critical feature for the proper functioning of election stock markets is market liquidity. As prediction markets function through aggregation of beliefs and opinions into market prices, high trading volume and/or a continuous stream of new investments are essential for prices to provide an accurate forecast of the election outcome. Signs that liquidity is lacking in an election stock market include wide spreads (large differences between bid and ask prices) and arbitrage opportunities (where the sum of bid prices exceeds the value of a unit portfolio, or where the sum of ask prices is lower than the value of a unit portfolio). As election stock markets are opinion aggregators, the accuracy of such markets can be expected to increase with the number of market participants. Investment caps (as maintained by the Iowa Electronic Markets and the UBC Election Stock Market) level the trading opportunities among traders. Whether investment caps help with prediction accuracy has not yet been determined conclusively. However, without an investment cap, commercial election stock markets may be dominated by a small number of traders.  The existence of transaction costs for investing and trading in commercial election stock markets may also reduce their efficiency.

Sunstein (2006) argues that prediction markets are often more accurate than deliberating groups because prediction markets create strong incentives for revelation of privately held knowledge and succeed in aggregating widely dispersed information. Contrastingly, deliberating groups often amplify individual errors, and group members may fall victim to a bad cascade, either informational or reputational. Deliberators may emphasize shared information at the expense of uniquely held information.

Academic papers 
Antweiler, Werner; Ross, Thomas W.: The 1997 UBC Election Stock Market. Canadian Business Economics, Vol. 6, No. 2, April 1998, pp. 15–22.
Berg, Joyce E.; Nelson, Forrest D.; Rietz, Thomas A.: Prediction market accuracy in the long run. International Journal of Forecasting, Vol 24, No. 2, April–June 2008, pp. 285–300.
Brander, James A. Election polls, free trade, and the stock market: evidence from the 1988 Canadian general election. Canadian Journal of Economics, volume 24, November 1991, pp. 827–43.
Erikson, Robert S.; Wlezien, Christopher: Are Political Markets Really Superior to Polls as Election Predictors? Public Opinion Quarterly 72(2), Summer 2008, pp. 190–215.
Forsythe, Robert; Rietz, Thomas A.; Ross, Thomas W.: Wishes, Expectations and Actions: A Survey on Price Formation in Election Stock Market. Journal of Economic Behavior and Organization, volume 39, 1999, pages 83–110.
Forsythe, Robert; Frank, Murray; Krishnamurthy, Vasu; Ross, Thomas W.: Markets as Predictors of Election Outcomes: Campaign Events and Judgement Bias in the 1993 Election Stock Market. Canadian Public Policy, volume 24, 1998, pp. 329–351.
Forsythe, Robert; Frank, Murray; Krishnamurthy, Vasu; Ross, Thomas W.: Using market prices to predict election results: the 1993 UBC election stock market. Canadian Journal of Economics, volume 28, number 4a, November 1995, pp. 770–794.
Forsythe, Robert; Nelson, F.; Neumann, G.R; Wright, J.: Anatomy of an experimental political stock market. American Economic Review, volume 82, 1992, pp. 1142–1161.
Forsythe, Robert; Nelson, F.; Neumann, G.R; Wright, J.: The Iowa political market: a field experiment. Research in Experimental Economics, volume 4, 1991.
Gemmill, Gordon: Political risk and market efficiency: tests based in British stock and options markets in the 1987 election. Journal of Banking and Finance, volume 16, February 1992, pp. 211–231.
Manski, Charles F.: Interpreting the prediction of prediction markets. Economics Letters, Vol 91, No. 3, pp. 425–429.
Sunstein, Cass R.: Deliberating Groups versus Prediction Markets (or Hayek's Challenge to Habermas). Episteme 6(1), October 2006, pp. 192–213.
Wolfers, Justin; Zitzewitz, Eric: Prediction Markets. Journal of Economic Perspectives 18(2), Spring 2004, pp. 107–126.

Academic journals 
The Journal of Prediction Markets

Popular articles 
 Stix, Gary: Super Tuesday: Markets Predict Outcome Better Than Polls. Scientific American, March 2008.

References

Prediction markets